A national airline is a country's flag carrier.

The National Airlines name has been used by several United States airlines:

National Airlines (1934–1980), a passenger airline based in Miami, Florida
National Airlines (1977–1986), a cargo and charter airline
National Airlines (1999–2002), low-cost airline based in Las Vegas, Nevada
National Airlines (N8), a cargo and charter airline based in Orlando, Florida
Private Jet Expeditions, an defunct airline operating as National Airlines in the US in the 1990s

See also
 Air National, an airline based in Auckland, New Zealand
 Nationair
 National Airways Corporation, an airline based in  Johannesburg, South Africa